Senchal lake, located 10 km to the south-east of Darjeeling, is the main reservoir of potable water for the town of Darjeeling, India. The water body is actually a twin lake: North Senchal lake, built in 1910 and South Senchal lake, built in 1932. The lake is located at an altitude of  atop a hill. The hill also has one of the highest golf courses in the world. Senchal is a favourite picnic spot. A tourist lodge at Senchal provides accommodation to tourists. This lake is a part of the Senchal Wildlife Sanctuary.

References

See also
Senchal Lake on Wikimapia

Tourist attractions in Darjeeling
Lakes of West Bengal
Reservoirs in India